Deverakonda Vijay Sai (born 9 May 1989), better known as Vijay Deverakonda, is an Indian actor and film producer who works predominantly in Telugu cinema. He is the recipient of a Filmfare Award, a Nandi Award, and a SIIMA Award. Since 2018, he has featured in Forbes Indias Celebrity 100 list.

Deverakonda made his debut with Nuvvila (2011) and received praise for his role in the coming-of-age drama Yevade Subramanyam (2015). He established himself as a leading film actor with the blockbusters Pelli Choopulu (2016) and Arjun Reddy (2017), winning the Filmfare Award for Best Actor – Telugu for his performance in the latter. He gained further success by starring in Mahanati (2018), Geetha Govindam (2018), and Taxiwaala (2018).

Deverakonda ventured into production under the banner King of the Hill Entertainment, which notably backed Meeku Maathrame Cheptha (2019) and Pushpaka Vimanam (2021). Beyond his film career, Deverakonda endorses many products and designed his own fashion brand Rowdy Wear, which premiered on Myntra in 2020. In January 2023, he became the co-owner of the premiere volleyball team, Hyderabad Black Hawks, in the RuPay Prime Volleyball League.

Early life 
Deverakonda Vijay Sai was born in Hyderabad, Andhra Pradesh (now Telangana) to Govardhan Rao and Madhavi. His family hails from Thummanpeta village of erstwhile Mahbubnagar district (now Nagarkurnool). His father was a television serial director who quit doing them due to lack of success. 

Vijay completed his schooling in Sri Sathya Sai Higher Secondary School, Puttaparthi, till his 10th standard. He then studied Intermediate at the Little Flower Junior College, Hyderabad. He holds a Bachelor of Commerce degree. His younger brother, Anand Devarakonda, is also an actor in Telugu cinema.

Career

Early career (2011–2015) 
Deverakonda made his debut with Ravi Babu-directed romantic comedy Nuvvila (2011). He later appeared in Sekhar Kammula's Life is Beautiful (2012) in a minor role. He was introduced to Nag Ashwin, who later cast him in a supporting role for the 2015 coming-of-age drama Yevade Subramanyam alongside actor Nani. The film was produced by the daughters of Ashwini Dutt, a producer in the Telugu film industry; Priyanka Dutt backed him and once shooting started, and Swapna Dutt signed him onto her company.

Breakthrough and success (2016–present) 

Deverakonda's first lead role was in Pelli Choopulu, a coming-of-age romance film directed by Tharun Bhascker. The film became commercially successful and won the Filmfare Award for Best Film – Telugu and the Best Feature Film in Telugu at the 64th National Film Awards. He starred in the masala film Dwaraka in 2017. He next starred in the romantic drama Arjun Reddy which received both praise and criticism for being bold and radical. However, his portrayal of a self-destructive, short-tempered, and alcoholic surgeon received widespread critical acclaim, and won him the Filmfare Award for Best Actor – Telugu. In 2019, Film Companion ranked Deverakonda's performance in Arjun Reddy in "100 Greatest Performances of the Decade".

Following Arjun Reddy he starred in Ye Mantram Vesave, which was supposed to release in 2013 but released on 2018. He then starred in Mahanati, a biographical film revolving around the life of actress Savitri. Deverakonda's next release in 2018 was Geetha Arts' romantic comedy Geetha Govindam, in which he starred as an innocent and nervous college professor. The film received mixed-to-positive reviews upon release, and proved to be a major commercial success at the box office. Deverakonda his second nomination for the Filmfare Award for Best Actor – Telugu for his performance in the film. His next film was the Tamil political thriller NOTA, directed by Anand Shankar, which performed poorly at the box office. His next project was UV Creations' supernatural comedy thriller Taxiwaala.

In 2019, Deverakonda was seen in Bharat Kamma's Dear Comrade, a romantic action drama, alongside Rashmika Mandanna. He later signed Hero, directed by Anand Annamalai co-starring Malavika Mohanan. But the film was reportedly shelved after beginning production. In 2020, he acted in Kranthi Madhav's romantic drama World Famous Lover opposite Raashi Khanna, Catherine Tresa, Aishwarya Rajesh, and Izabelle Leite which opened to negative reviews. In 2022, he acted in the Hindi–Telugu bilingual film Liger which was directed by Puri Jagannadh and produced by Karan Johar which also opened to highly negative reviews. He is currently acting in Kushi which is directed by Shiva Nirvana and is scheduled to release on 23 December 2022. He also is signed onto Jana Gana Mana which is being directed by Puri Jagannadh, and is scheduled to release on 3 August 2023.

Other work 
He was the brand ambassador of food delivery app Zomato. On 15 October 2018, Deverakonda launched his fashion brand Rowdy Wear. Later, in 2020 Rowdy Wear was launched on Myntra.

Deverakonda has donated to relief funds, including a donation to families of victims in the 2019 Pulwama attack.

Deverakonda conceptualised and founded The Deverakonda Foundation, a nonprofit organisation in April 2019. In early 2020, he donated ₹24,000 through the Foundation to help Ganesh Ambari, a kickboxer who won the Vaco Indian Open International Kick-boxing Championship Title 2020.

An initiative was started to battle COVID-19 pandemic crisis. The foundation has successfully aided 17,000 middle-class families with their groceries and basic essentials, spending ₹1.7 crores, with the help of his Middle Class Fund (MCF). More than 8,500 volunteers donated over ₹1.5 crores to join his community effort. Organizers decided to end the initiative on 2 June 2020.

In the media 

Deverakonda says his family used to call him a rowdy every time he did something that they did not approve of. Over time, he started using this term for himself and his fans.

Deverakonda is known to express his real, unfiltered opinions on stage or at interviews and has gathered a lot of popularity and some criticism for his brutal honesty, like his speech at the Arjun Reddy audio launch in 2017.

Deverakonda placed 72nd in the Forbes India Celebrity 100 list of 2018. He was ranked in The Times Most Desirable Men at No. 4 in 2018, at No. 3 in 2019, at No. 2 in 2020.  He was additionally featured by Forbes India in their 30 Under 30 list, and became the most-searched South Indian actor according to Google's annual report.

Filmography

As actor

As producer

TV shows

Awards and nominations

References

External links 

 
 
 Vijay Deverakonda at Bollywood Hungama

1989 births
Living people
Filmfare Awards South winners
Male actors in Telugu cinema
Indian male film actors
Indian male stage actors
21st-century Indian male actors
Telugu male actors
Male actors from Telangana
People from Nagarkurnool district
Male actors in Tamil cinema
Male actors in Hindi cinema
Nandi Award winners
South Indian International Movie Awards winners